Hoffmanns's titi monkey (Plecturocebus hoffmannsi) is a species of titi monkey, a type of New World monkey, endemic to Brazil. It was described as Callicebus hoffmannsi in 1908.

References

Hoffmanns's titi
Mammals of Brazil
Endemic fauna of Brazil
Hoffmanns's titi
Hoffmanns's titi